Romano Ramoo (born 25 April 1987) is a South African cricketer. He played in 34 first-class, 36 List A, and 10 Twenty20 matches from 2008 to 2014.

References

External links
 

1987 births
Living people
South African cricketers
Border cricketers
Western Province cricketers
Cricketers from East London, Eastern Cape